The 2002 Grand Prix of Sonoma was the second round of the 2002 American Le Mans Series season.  It took place at Infineon Raceway, California, on May 19, 2002.

Official results
Class winners in bold.

† - #0 Team Olive Garden was disqualified for failing post-race technical inspection.  The car used an illegal air restrictor

Statistics
 Pole Position - #38 Champion Racing - 1:22.615
 Fastest Lap - #37 Intersport Racing - 1:26.247
 Distance - 337.946 km
 Average Speed - 122.635 km/h

External links
 
 World Sports Racing Prototypes - Race Results

S
Grand Prix of Sonoma